I'll Tell the World is a 1934 American pre-Code comedy film directed by Edward Sedgwick and written by Ralph Spence and Dale Van Every. The film stars Lee Tracy, Gloria Stuart, Roger Pryor, Onslow Stevens, Alec B. Francis and Willard Robertson. The film was released on April 21, 1934, by Universal Pictures.

Plot

Cast 
Lee Tracy as Stanley Brown
Gloria Stuart as Jane Hamilton
Roger Pryor as William S. Briggs
Onslow Stevens as Prince Michael
Alec B. Francis as Grand Duke Ferdinand
Willard Robertson as Hardwick
Lawrence Grant as Count Strumsky
Leon Ames as Spud Marshall 
Wilhelm von Brincken as Joseph
Craig Reynolds as Aviator 
Herman Bing as Adolph
Dorothy Granger as Brown's Girlfriend

References

External links 
 

1934 films
1930s English-language films
American comedy films
1934 comedy films
Universal Pictures films
Films directed by Edward Sedgwick
American black-and-white films
Films set in Europe
Films about journalists
1930s American films
English-language comedy films